Nikolay Davydenko was the defending champion but did not compete that year.

Dominik Hrbatý won in the final 6–4, 6–0 against Michaël Llodra.

Seeds

  Wayne Ferreira (first round)
  Vince Spadea (quarterfinals)
  Arnaud Clément (second round)
  Robby Ginepri (first round)
  Taylor Dent (semifinals)
  Jarkko Nieminen (semifinals)
  Alberto Martín (second round)
  Nicolás Lapentti (second round)

Draw

Finals

Top half

Bottom half

External links
 2004 AAPT Championships Draw

Next Generation Adelaide International
2004 ATP Tour
2004 in Australian tennis